Bridge Lake Provincial Park is a provincial park in British Columbia, Canada.  It is located at the eastern end of the lake of the same name, adjacent to the community of the same name, which is the largest community on the Interlakes Highway. It was established in 1956, and a merge with the nearby Bridge Lake Centennial Park in 2004 and another expansion in 2013 brought the park to its current size.

References

External links

Provincial parks of British Columbia
Geography of the Cariboo
1956 establishments in British Columbia
Protected areas established in 1956